Government Akbar Ali College is an honors level college in Ullahpara Upazila of Sirajganj District, Bangladesh.

History 
The college was nationalized in 1984.
Passing HSC from this college many students are studying country's best universities.

Academics
The college is co-educational.

Curriculum
The college's curriculum includes traditional intermediate level academic subjects. Students have to select one of the three major programs: Arts and Humanities, Commerce, or Science. It also includes traditional undergraduate programme(degree and honour) on various subjects. The honour subjects are Bangla, English, History, Islamic Studies, Economics, Philosophy, Political Studies, Chemistry, Physics, Mathematics, Botany, Zoology, Accounting, Management.

References

Colleges in Sirajganj District
Universities and colleges in Sirajganj District
Educational institutions established in 1970
1970 establishments in East Pakistan